Edward Spence VC (28 December 1830 – 17 April 1858) was a Scottish recipient of the Victoria Cross, the highest and most prestigious award for gallantry in the face of the enemy that can be awarded to British and Commonwealth forces.

Details
Spence was 27 years old, and a private in the 42nd Regiment of Foot (later The Black Watch (Royal Highlanders)), British Army during the Indian Mutiny when the following deed took place for which he was awarded the VC. On 15 April 1858 during the attack on Fort Ruhya, India, Private Spence volunteered along with Lance-Corporal Alexander Thompson, to assist captain William Martin Cafe in bringing in the body of a lieutenant from the top of the glacis. His citation read:

The medal
His Victoria Cross is displayed at the Black Watch Museum, Perth, Scotland.

References

Monuments to Courage (David Harvey, 1999)
The Register of the Victoria Cross (This England, 1997)
Scotland's Forgotten Valour (Graham Ross, 1995)

1830 births
1858 deaths
British recipients of the Victoria Cross
Black Watch soldiers
Indian Rebellion of 1857 recipients of the Victoria Cross
People from Dumfries
British Army personnel of the Crimean War
British military personnel killed in the Indian Rebellion of 1857
British Army recipients of the Victoria Cross